Mizz Eva (a.k.a. Chan Sze-wai, born 17 October 1981) was the first female rapper in Hong Kong. Her first album was "L for..(2004)".

Filmography
 The Election (2014-2015)
 The Menu (2015)
 Night Shift (2015)

References

External links
Official Site
陳詩慧歌迷論壇

1981 births
Hong Kong women rappers
Living people
Hong Kong women singer-songwriters